An amicus curiae is an individual or organization who is not a party to a legal case, but who is permitted to assist a court by offering information, expertise, or insight that has a bearing on the issues in the case. The decision on whether to consider an amicus brief lies within the discretion of the court. The phrase is legal Latin and the origin of the term has been dated to 1605–1615. The scope of amici curiae is generally found in the cases where broad public interests are involved and concerns regarding civil rights are in question.

In American law, an amicus curiae typically refers to what in some other jurisdictions is known as an intervenor: a person or organization who requests to provide legal submissions so as to offer a relevant alternative or additional perspective regarding the matters in dispute. In the American courts, the amicus may be referred to as an amicus brief.  In other jurisdictions, such as Canada, an amicus curiae is a lawyer who is asked by the court to provide legal submissions regarding issues that would otherwise not be aired properly, often because one or both of the parties is not represented by counsel.

History 
Direct or indirect connections between the amicus curiae figure and the Roman juridical experience are still debated. Some scholars simply explain the Latin expression with the fact that the cultural elites' (including the jurists one) language of the Anglo-Saxon world of the past was the Latin, so many Latin legal terms spread in the English law before and so in the Law of the United States then also. The Italian academic Giovanni Criscuoli, while admitting the theoretical possibility of eventually compare it with the Roman figure of the "consiliarius", concludes that: "it is a figure of exclusive Anglo-Saxon blood".

Starting in the 9th century, it was incorporated into English law, and it was later extended to most common law systems. Later, it was introduced in international law, in particular concerning human rights. From there, it was integrated in some civil law systems (it has been, as at 2013, integrated into Argentina's law system and Honduras's 2010 civil procedures code). Today, it is used by the European Court of Human Rights, the Inter-American Commission on Human Rights, the Inter-American Court of Human Rights, the Court of Justice of the European Union and the Special Tribunal for Lebanon.

Presentation 
The role of an amicus is, as stated by Salmon LJ (as Lord Salmon then was) in Allen v Sir Alfred McAlpine & Sons Ltd [1968] 2 QB 229 at p. 266 F-G:

The situation most often noted in the press is when an advocacy group files a brief in a case before an appellate court in which it is not a litigant.  Appellate cases are normally limited to the factual record and arguments coming from the lower court case under appeal; attorneys focus on the facts and arguments most favorable to their clients.  Where a case may have broader implications, amicus curiae briefs are a way to articulate those concerns, so that the possibly broad legal or public policy implications of the court's anticipated decisions will not depend solely on the positions and arguments advanced by the parties directly involved in the case.

In prominent cases, amici curiae are generally organizations with sizable legal budgets. In the United States, for example, non-profit legal advocacy organizations, such as the American Civil Liberties Union, the Landmark Legal Foundation, the Pacific Legal Foundation, the Electronic Frontier Foundation, the American Center for Law and Justice or the National Organization for the Reform of Marijuana Laws (NORML), frequently submit such briefs to advocate for or against a particular legal change or interpretation. If a decision could affect an entire industry, companies other than the litigants may wish to have their concerns heard.  In the United States, federal courts often hear cases involving the constitutionality of state laws.  Hence states may file briefs as amici curiae when their laws or interests are likely to be affected, as in the Supreme Court case McDonald v. Chicago, when thirty-two states under the aegis of Texas (and California independently) filed such briefs.

Amici curiae who do not file briefs often present an academic perspective on the case.  For example, if the law gives deference to a history of legislation of a certain topic, a historian may choose to evaluate the claim from their specialized expertise. An economist, statistician, or sociologist may choose to do the same. Newspaper editorials, blogs, and other opinion pieces arguably have the capability to influence Supreme Court decisions as de facto amici curiae. They are not, however, technically considered amici curiae, as they do not submit materials to the Court, do not need to ask for leave, and have no guarantee that they will be read.

United States Supreme Court rules
The Supreme Court of the United States has special rules for amicus curiae briefs sought to be filed in cases pending before it. Supreme Court Rule 37 states, in part, such a brief should cover "relevant matter" not dealt with by the parties which "may be of considerable help". The cover of an amicus brief must identify which party the brief is supporting, or if the brief supports only affirmance or reversal. The Court also requires that all non-governmental amici identify those providing a monetary contribution to the preparation or submission of the brief. Briefs must be prepared in booklet format, and 40 copies must be served with the Court.

In the United States Supreme Court, unless the amicus brief is being filed by the federal government (or one of its officers or agents) or a U.S. state, permission of the court (by means of motion for leave) or mutual consent of the parties is generally required. Allowing an amicus curiae to present oral argument is considered "extraordinary". The court can also appoint its own amicus curiae if neither party supports the decision of the lower court, which it has done at least 44 times.

In the World Trade Organization 
The role of amicus curiae briefs in the World Trade Organization (WTO) dispute settlement system is controversial. The controversy arises due to the governmental nature of WTO disputes. As only WTO members have access to the system, any non-members such as non-governmental organizations (NGOs) are excluded and have no right to be heard. Thus the only way for them to contribute to a WTO decision is through amicus curiae briefs. To date there is a divergence in approaches in the WTO as to the admissibility of such briefs.

Panel and Appellate Body reports 
The first WTO case to comprehensively examine the admissibility of amicus curiae briefs was US – Shrimp. The case concerned a ban by the US on imports of all shrimp and shrimp products not caught with turtle excluder devices. The panel at first instance rejected the two amicus curiae briefs that were submitted by environmental groups, on the basis they were not expressly solicited by the panel under Article 13 of the Dispute Settlement Understanding of the WTO. This was overturned by the Appellate Body who held a panel had authority to accept, consider or reject briefs under Articles 12 and 13 of the Dispute Settlement Understanding regardless of whether they were expressly solicited.

The issue was re-examined in US – Lead and Bismuth II which concerned the imposition of duties by the US on certain imported hot rolled lead and bismuth carbon steel from the UK. The Panel at first instance affirmed the position in the US – Shrimp case and accepted two amicus curiae briefs that were submitted. On appeal, the Appellate Body relied on Article 17.9 of the Dispute Settlement Understanding and Rule 16(1) of the Working Procedures for Appellate Review to create rules to accept amicus curiae briefs. This was deemed as the source of legal authority to accept such briefs by an Appellate Body.

The next significant case to deal with amicus curiae briefs was EC – Asbestos, where the French government banned domestically produced and imported asbestos products. Of the five amicus curiae briefs received by the Panel, only two that were submitted by the European Community, were accepted. The panel did not provide any explanation as to why they were accepted or rejected. On appeal, the Appellate Body relied on Rule 16(1) of the Working Procedures for Appellate Review to create additional procedures to deal with the amicus curiae briefs. Of the 11 briefs submitted, the Appellate Body accepted none on the basis they failed to comply with these additional procedures.

Canada
In Canadian law, an amicus curiae is a lawyer, rather than an outside entity, who is asked by the Court to provide submissions in such a way as to make sure the legal issues affecting the interests of all parties are properly canvassed. Where one of the parties (e.g. the accused in a criminal case) is unrepresented (and is ineligible for or refuses to apply for legal aid), and the judge is concerned that this will leave that party at a significant disadvantage and risk a miscarriage of justice, the judge may appoint a lawyer as amicus curiae. The lawyer is not retained by and does not represent the unrepresented party as such, but he or she has a responsibility to ensure that points of law of importance to the party's case are brought to the attention of the court. For example, in the case of a criminal trial, the amicus will have the responsibility to ensure that the accused's right to make full answer and defence is upheld. Examples of situations that could call for the appointment of amicus could include a highly complex or technical trial, an unsophisticated accused or one with cognitive or psychiatric challenges, or an unruly and disruptive accused. In some cases, when an accused has retained counsel for part of the trial but then fires that counsel, and if the judge finds that amicus is needed, the former counsel may be asked to remain as amicus, given his or her familiarity with the case.

Another situation in which amicus may be appointed is when an accused is self-represented in a trial for offences such as sexual assault or assault in a domestic violence context. An unrepresented accused has the right to cross-examine Crown witnesses, but it may be undesirable to permit him or her to personally cross-examine, for example, the complainant. As a result, the Criminal Code permits the judge to order that the accused will not personally cross-examine the witness, and to name an uninvolved lawyer to conduct the cross-examination in place of the accused.

Constitutional Court of Italy rules
In Italian law, amici curiae are "nonprofit organizations and the institutional subjects, bearers of collective or diffuse interests related to the issue of constitutionality" who "may submit a written opinion to the constitutional Court".

See also
 Intervention (law)

References

External links

 Amicus curiae at the Merriam-Webster Online Dictionary
 Amicus curiae at the MSN Encarta Dictionary (2009-10-31)
 Definitions from Dictionary.com
 Amicus curiae at the The Free Dictionary, Thesaurus and Encyclopedia

Latin legal terminology
Legal documents
Roman law

pt:Anexo:Lista de expressões jurídicas em latim#A